Afnan Ullah Khan is a Pakistani politician who is currently serving as a member of the Senate of Pakistan from the Punjab Province since March 2021. He belongs to Pakistan Muslim League (N). He is the son of a former federal minister and senator Mushahid Ullah Khan.

References

Living people
Year of birth missing (living people)
Pakistani Senators 2021–2027
Pakistan Muslim League (N) politicians